The following highways are numbered 603:

Canada
Alberta Highway 603
 Ontario Highway 603
 Saskatchewan Highway 603

Costa Rica
 National Route 603

United States